is a special city located in Saitama Prefecture, Japan. The cultural and economic value of the paulownia is reflected in its designation as the official town tree.

Geography
Kasukabe is located in far eastern Saitama Prefecture, divided between the Shimosa Plateau and the Omiya Plateau by the Nakagawa lowlands and the Edogawa River. The eastern portion of the city is still rural, with the largest area of paddy fields in Saitama.

Surrounding municipalities
 Saitama Prefecture
 Koshigaya
 Saitama
 Shiraoka
 Miyashiro
 Sugito
 Matsubushi
 Chiba Prefecture
 Noda

Climate
Kasukabe has a humid subtropical climate (Köppen Cfa) characterized by warm summers and cool winters with light to no snowfall.

Demographics
Per Japanese census data, the population of Kasukabe peaked around the year 2000 and has declined slightly since.

History
The area of Kasukabe was part of ancient Musashi Province and has been settled since at least the Jomon period as evidenced by many shell middens and ancient burial mounds. During the Edo period, Kasukabe prospered as a post station on the Nikkō Kaidō highway linking Edo with Nikkō.

The town of Kasukabe was created within Minamisaitama District, Saitama with the establishment of the modern municipalities system on April 1, 1889. On April 1, 1944, Kasukabe annexed the neighboring village of Uchimaki. On July 1, 1954, Kasukabe was elevated to city status after annexing the villages of Toyoharu, Takesato, Komatsu and Toyono. On October 1, 2005, old Kasukabe city and the town of Shōwa (from Kitakatsushika District) were merged into the new and expanded city of Kasukabe. Kasukabe was elevated to special city status on April 1, 2008, giving it increased local autonomy.

Government
Kasukabe has a mayor-council form of government with a directly elected mayor and a unicameral city council of 32 members. Kasukabe contributes three members to the Saitama Prefectural Assembly. In terms of national politics, the city is divided between Saitama 13th district and Saitama 14th district of the lower house of the Diet of Japan.

Economy
Kasukabe is a regional commercial center with a mixed economy.

Education
Kyoei University
Kasukabe  has 22 public elementary schools and 11 public middle schools operated by the city government, and five public high schools operated by the Saitama Prefectural Board of Education, including the Saitama Prefectural Kasukabe High School and Kasukabe Girls' Senior High School.  In addition, there is one private combined middle/high school. The prefecture also operates one special education school for the disabled.

Transportation

Railway
 Tōbu Railway - Tobu Skytree Line
 -   -  - 
 Tōbu Railway -  Tobu Urban Park Line
 -  -  -  -

Highway

System City relations
  Pasadena, California, United States, friendship city since July 3, 1993. Pasadena, California's Junior Chamber of Commerce does an exchange program each summer, alternating every year with Kasukabe residents going to Pasadena one summer and Pasadena residents coming to Kasukabe the next summer.
 – Fraser Coast Region, Queensland, Australia, friendship city since April 29, 2007.

Local attractions
Metropolitan Area Outer Underground Discharge Channel has a public entrance in Kasukabe. Also known as G-CANs, this huge underground flood control system was completed in 2009. The monumental main storage chamber, sometimes called the "underground temple", has been the setting for TV shows and commercials. It is open to tours.
Kasukabe Hachiman-gu
Ushijima Wisteria
Uchiaki Park

Shopping
Kasukabe is home to what was formerly one of the two Robinsons department stores in Japan, which became a Seibu department store in March 2013. The large, seven-story American-style store is a landmark for residents. It is located on the east side of Kasukabe Station. However, Seibu is scheduled to close its doors due to a shortage of business, likely caused by competition with Aeon Mall.

Close to the west entrance to the station is a shopping mall, known as Lala Garden, housing several chain retail stores, such as Uniqlo, Gap, ABC-Mart, as well as a supermarket, 100-yen shop, and more. There is also an Ito-Yokado on the west side of the station.

In March 2013, an Aeon mall opened on National Route 16, which shoppers can either reach by car, or by taking a regularly scheduled bus from the east entrance of the station. This mall, as well as Lala Garden, has a movie theatre.

In popular culture
Kasukabe is the setting of the manga and anime series Lucky Star and Crayon Shin-chan. Shin-chan's creator Yoshito Usui also lived in Kasukabe.

References

External links

Official Website 

Cities in Saitama Prefecture
Kasukabe, Saitama